Msheireb Downtown Doha is a planned city in Doha, Qatar being constructed in place of the current district of Mushayrib. Initial construction began in January 2010. Located in the downtown area of Qatar's capital city, it is set to occupy 310,000 sq m with the total cost of construction amounting to approximately $5.5 billion. It was launched in six phases by Msheireb Properties, a subsidiary of Qatar Foundation.

The project is a flagship project for Msheireb Properties, and aims to preserve the historical downtown area of Doha.

Project overview 
Msheireb means ‘a place to drink water’ in Arabic.

Construction phases
The city has six construction phases: Phase 1A, Phase 1B, Phase 1C, Phase 2, Phase 3 and Phase 4.

Phase 1A's contract was awarded to a consortium consisting of Hyundai Engineering & Construction and Hamad Bin Khalid Contracting Company.

Phase 1B began in December 2011, and Carillion and Qatar Building Company were selected as the main contractors. In January 2018, Carillion's UK business went into liquidation blaming its collapse on problem contracts including the Msheireb Downtown Doha project, where the company claimed it was owed £200m - former CEO Richard Howson said he felt like "a bailiff" in chasing the debt. However, this claim was quickly disputed by Msheireb Properties, who said it had continued to pay Carillion but Carillion did not pass funds on to its supply chain, leaving over 40 subcontractors unpaid, resulting in Msheireb incurring additional costs to pay Carillion’s suppliers and engaging a new contractor to complete the project. The Qataris were prepared to testify to the UK Parliamentary committees investigating Carillion's collapse, provided written evidence to them, and were considering a £200m claim against Carillion. In June 2018, Carillion (Qatar) LLC went into liquidation.

The project was expected to take two years, but the customer was said to have changed architect three times and issued 40,000 new drawings. The project is now due to finish in December 2018.

Brookfield Multiplex and Medgulf were contracted for Phase 1C in November 2012.

Phase 2 began in December 2012, with Arabtec Construction being awarded the contract. In May 2013, Obayashi Corporation and Hamad Bin Khalid Contracting Company were awarded the contract for Phase 3.

Location 
Msheireb Downtown Doha is located at Mohamed Bin Jassim District – central Doha, bordered by:
 Al Rayyan Road to the North; 
 Jassim Bin Mohamed Street to the East;
 Msheireb Street to the South; and 
 Al Diwan Street (part of Ring Road A) to the West.
The Msheireb project site is immediately adjacent to the Amiri Diwan, Qatar’s seat of government and Ruler’s palace. The site is also adjacent to the redeveloped Souk Waqif, a successful mixed-use scheme based on a traditional Qatari souk and the historical Al Koot Fort.

Master plan 

The master plan comprises six distinct phases. The first phase, referred to as the ‘Diwan Amiri Quarter’, currently under construction, features a combination of three major government buildings including the National Archive, along with heritage sites, a museum and an Eid Prayer Ground.

Subsequent phases include a 5-star Mandarin Oriental Hotel, Park Hyatt Doha & MGallery along with 1 additional hotel, commercial office space, a multitude of residential types and a wide variety of retail shops and restaurants. There is also a significant community and arts focus, featuring a cultural forum, school, nurseries and mosques.

Quarters

Diwan Amiri Quarter 
Anchored at the northeast corner of the project, the Diwan Amiri Quarter is adjacent to both the Amiri Diwan and the Al Koot Fort.

Heritage Quarter 

The Heritage Quarter is a historic area which contains traditional courtyard houses and the recently-restored Msheireb Eid Prayer Ground, dating to the first decade of 20th century, alongside a newly constructed mosque. The newly-renovated Msheireb Eid Prayer Ground, found opposite of Al Koot Fort and in close proximity to Souq Waqif, was inaugurated in October 2014. It occupies 3,200 square meters and can hold up to 3,600 worshippers.

This quarter hosts the Heritage Houses, which include the Bin Jelmood House, the Company House, the Mohammed bin Jassim House and the Radwani House. The Heritage Houses have been refurbished and re-purposed as individual museums that collectively constitute the Msheireb Museums, a project that was formally opened to the public in October 2015.

Retail Quarter 
The largest of all five quarters, the Retail Quarter will feature the Galleria an enclosed shopping mall, with several international flagship stores, cinema, supermarket, children's edutainment zone and numerous dining outlets.

Mixed-Use & Residential Quarter 
Mixed-Use Quarter will have a combination of commercial, retail and residential properties that overlap the Retail Quarter.

Business Gateway 
Spread over 193,000 square metres, the Business Gateway will offer business amenities, supported by a mix of banking, personal and civic services.

Construction updates

Phase 1A 
Consists of Diwan Ameri Quarter (Diwan Annex, Amiri Guard and National Archive), Heritage buildings, mosque, amenities & Infrastructure (District Cooling Plant, Substations and Service Corridors).  Total number of Buildings is 7.

Status:
 Enabling Works: The works are 100% Complete.
 Infrastructure Works: The works are 100% Complete.
 Main Building works: Main Building Works are complete 100% complete.

Phase 1B/1C 
Comprises Offices, Town Houses, Apartments, Amenities, Hotel, Civil Buildings, School, Cultural Centre and Mosque.  Total number of buildings is 56.

Status: 
 Enabling Works: The works are 100% Complete.
 Piling Works: The works are 100% Complete.
 1B Main Building Works: 62.8% of the work completed. (Target Completion July-2016).
 1C Main Building Works: 66.8% of the work completed (Target Completion Aug-2016).
 Substructure works: The works are 100% completed.

Phase 2 
Mainly comprises Retail, Offices, Apartments, Cinemas, Department Store and Hotel.  Total number of buildings is 10.

Status:
 Enabling Works: was awarded to Ammico in Jun-2010 and 100% complete 
 Construction Works: 55.8% of the work completed (Target Completion Jun-2016)

Phase 3 
Comprises Retail, Offices, Apartments and Hotel.  Total number of buildings is 14.

Status:
 Demolition Works: 100% of the works is completed.
 Enabling Works: 100% of the works is completed.
 Raft Package: 100% of the works is completed.
 Main Work Package: 51.0% of the work completed (Target Completion Oct-2016).

Phase 4 
Mainly comprises Retail, Offices, Apartments, Hotel, and Amenities & Metro. Total number of buildings is 13.

Design
Three-year project with leading architects, city planners, engineers, and academics (including specialists from Harvard, Princeton, Yale and MIT) to understand how insights from the past can be combined with present-day technologies and thinking to achieve a new, distinctly Qatari architectural language.

Language comprises seven ‘steps’ or distinct design principles: Past and Future; Individual and Collective; Space and Form; Aspects of Home; Aspects of the Street; Climate Design; Language of Architecture.

Approximately 25% of the city will be allocated towards residential developments. Hotels, shops and retail establishments will take up a combined space of 26%, while government buildings have been allotted roughly more than one-third of the entire area. The city is expected to accommodate around 15,000 residents.

Msheireb Downtown Doha is set to contain one of the largest collection of LEED-certified buildings in the world.

Sustainability 
Sustainability is central to the Msheireb project, in terms of both the conservation of natural resources and the quality of its design.

All buildings within the development will target an average Gold rating under the internationally recognized LEED (Leadership in Energy and Environmental Design) certification system developed by the US Green Building Council, while several buildings will aim for a Platinum rating.

The entire project features sustainable design that consumes fewer resources, generates less waste, costs less to operate, and achieves a reduced carbon footprint.

Gallery

See also
Mushayrib
Msheireb station

References

Planned cities in Qatar
Doha